The season 2004–05 of Segunda División B of Spanish football started August 2004 and ended May 2005.

Group I
Teams of Madrid, Galicia, Balearic Islands and Canary Islands.

Liguilla de Ascenso:
 Pontevedra - Promoted to the Second Division
 Racing de Ferrol - Promoted to the Second Division
 Celta de Vigo B - Eliminated in the Group A
 CD Ourense - Eliminated in the Group D

Promoted to this group from Tercera División:
 Atlético Arteixo - Founded in: 1949//, Based in: Arteixo, Galicia//, Promoted from: Group 1
 Navalcarnero - Founded in: 1961//, Based in: Navalcarnero, Madrid//, Promoted from: Group 7
 Castillo  - Founded in: 1960//, Based in: Castillo del Romeral, Canary Islands//, Promoted from: Group 12

Relegated to this group from Segunda División:
 Las Palmas - Founded in: 1949//, Based in: Las Palmas, Canary Islands//, Relegated From: Segunda División
 Leganés - Founded in: 1928//, Based in: Leganés, Madrid//, Relegated From: Segunda División
 Rayo Vallecano - Founded in: 1924//, Based in: Vallecas, Madrid//, Relegated From: Segunda División

Relegated to Tercera División:
 Compostela - Founded in: 1962//, Based in: Santiago de Compostela, Galicia//, Relegated to: Group 1
 Rayo Majadahonda - Founded in: 1976//, Based in: Majadahonda, Madrid//, Relegated to: Group 7

Teams
{{Location map+ |Spain |width=500|float=right |caption=Location of teams in Segunda División B Gr. 1 2004–05 |places=

League table

Results

Top goalscorers

Group II
Teams of Basque Country, Castile and León, Cantabria, Asturias and La Rioja.

Liguilla de Ascenso:
 Atlético Madrid B - Eliminated on Group C
 Real Madrid B - Eliminated on Group D
 CD Mirandés - Eliminated on Group B
 Cultural y Deportiva Leonesa - Eliminated on Group A

Promoted to this group from Tercera División:
 Marino de Luanco - Founded in: 1931//, Based in: Luanco, Asturias//, Promoted from: Group 2
 Sestao River Club - Founded in: 1996//, Based in: Sestao, Basque Country//, Promoted from: Group 4
 Lemona - Founded in: 1923//, Based in: Lemoa, Basque Country //, Promoted from: Group 4
 Guijuelo - Founded in: 1974//, Based in: Guijuelo, Castile and León//, Promoted from: Group 8

Relegated to this group from Segunda División:
 None

Relegated to Tercera División:
 Logroñés - Founded in: 1940//, Based in: Logroño, La Rioja//, Relegated to: Group 15
 Racing Santander B - Founded in: 1993//, Based in: Santander, Cantabria//, Relegated to: Group 3
 Calahorra - Founded in: 1923//, Based in: Calahorra, La Rioja//, Relegated to: Group 15
 Caudal - Founded in: 1918//, Based in: Mieres, Asturias//, Relegated to: Group 2
 Real Avilés Industrial - Founded in: 1903//, Based in: Avilés, Asturias//, Relegated to: Group 2

Teams

League Table

Results

Top goalscorers

Group III
Teams of Catalonia, Valencian Community, Aragon and Navarre.

Liguilla de Ascenso:
 Lleida - Promoted to Second Division
 Lorca - Eliminated on Group B
 Gimnàstic de Tarragona - Promoted to Second Division
 Castellón - Eliminated on Group C

Promoted to this group from Tercera División:
 Badalona - Founded in: 1903//, Based in: Badalona, Catalonia//, Promoted from: Group 5
 Benidorm - Founded in: 1964//, Based in: Benidorm, Valencian Community//, Promoted from: Group 6
 Alcoyano - Founded in: 1928//, Based in: Alcoy, Valencian Community //, Promoted from: Group 6
 Levante B - Founded in: 1962//, Based in: Buñol, Valencian Community //, Promoted from: Group 6
 Peralta - Founded in: 1927//, Based in: Peralta, Navarre //, Promoted from: Group 15

Relegated to this group from Segunda División:
 None

Relegated to Tercera División:
 Valencia B - Founded in: 1944//, Based in: Valencia, Valencian Community//, Relegated to: Group 6
 Mataró - Founded in: 1912//, Based in: Mataró, Catalonia//, Relegated to: Group 5
 Palamós - Founded in: 1898//, Based in: Palamós, Catalonia//, Relegated to: Group 5
 Casetas - Founded in: 1922//, Based in: Casetas, Aragon//, Relegated to: Group 16

Teams
{{Location map+ |Spain |width=500|float=right |caption=Location of teams in Segunda División B Gr. 3 2004–05 |places=

League Table

Results

Top goalscorers

Group IV
Teams of Andalusia, Extremadura, Castile La Mancha, Ceuta, Melilla and Murcia.

Liguilla de Ascenso:
 Lanzarote - Eliminated on Group D
 Pájara Playas - Eliminated on Group A
 Sevilla B - Eliminated on Group C
 Badajoz - Eliminated on Group B

Promoted to this group from Tercera División:
 Arenas CyD - Founded in: 1931//, Based in: Armilla, Granada, Andalusia//, Promoted from: Group 9
 Alcalá - Founded in: 1945//, Based in: Alcalá de Guadaíra, Andalusia//, Promoted from: Group 10
 Don Benito - Founded in: 1928//, Based in: Don Benito, Extremadura //, Promoted from: Group 14
 Díter Zafra - Founded in: 1930//, Based in: Zafra, Extremadura //, Promoted from: Group 14

Relegated to this group from Segunda División:
 Algeciras - Founded in: 1909/, Based in: Algeciras, Andalusia//, Relegated From: Second Division

Relegated to Tercera División:
 Real Betis B - Founded in: 1969//, Based in: Seville, Andalusia//, Relegated to: Group X
 Cacereño - Founded in: 1919//, Based in: Cáceres, Extremadura//, Relegated to: Group XIV
 Mérida - Founded in: 1990//, Based in: Mérida, Extremadura//, Relegated to: Group XIV
 Villanovense - Founded in: 1992//, Based in: Villanueva de la Serena, Extremadura//, Relegated to: Group XIV
 Los Palacios - Founded in: 1964//, Based in: Los Palacios y Villafranca, Andalusia//, Relegated to: Group X

Teams

League Table

Results

Top goalscorers

External links
Futbolme.com

 
Segunda División B seasons

3
Spain